The Argus As 8 was a four-cylinder, air-cooled, inverted inline aircraft engine produced in Germany by Argus Motoren in the 1930s.

Variants
As 8AInitial production version  maximum for 5 minutes,  continuous.
As 8BA more powerful variant developing  maximum for 5 minutes,  continuous.
As 8RA variant produced for sport aircraft, particularly for competition use, developing  for take-off. Featuring:
Increased compression ratio, from 5.36 to 5.8
Improved cooling by increasing the numbers of cooling fins at the cylinder head and the cylinder body
Increasing the heat dispersing area of the pistons
Improved crankcase and oil cooling
Improved cylinder charging
Modified valve timing

Applications
Albatros L 100
Albatros Al 101
Arado L II (As 8A)
Arado L IIa (As 8R)
Baumgärtl Heliofly III
BFW M.23
BFW M.27
BFW M.29
BFW M.35
Blohm & Voss Ha 136
Comte AC-12 Moskito
Darmstadt D-22
DFS 40
Focke-Wulf Fw 44
Heinkel He 64
Heinkel He 72
Klemm L 25E
Klemm Kl 32
Raab-Katzenstein RK.25/32
Ruhrtaler Ru.3

Specifications (As 8B)

See also

References

Further reading

External links

 Das Virtuelle Luftfahrtmuseum

Air-cooled aircraft piston engines
Argus aircraft engines
1930s aircraft piston engines
Inverted aircraft piston engines